Johann Friedrich Eduard Sobolewski (born Königsberg (Królewiec), October 1, 1804 or 1808 - died St. Louis, May 17, 1872) was a Polish-American violinist, composer, and conductor.

Sobolewski studied with Carl Friedrich Zelter in Berlin, and with Carl Maria von Weber in Dresden between 1821 and 1824. He became music director at the Königsberg Theater in 1830. He was the founder and conductor of the Philharmonische Gesellschaft, which he established in 1838, as well as the founder of the Königsberg Musikalische Akademie, established 1843. From 1847 to 1853 he led the Königsberg Theater, after which he led the theater in Bremen. In 1859 he emigrated to Milwaukee, Wisconsin, and quickly founded the city's Philharmonic Society Orchestra alongside efforts to stage operas. In 1860 he moved to St. Louis and became conductor of their Philharmonic Society from 1860 to 1866. He was professor of vocal music from 1869 to his death in 1872 at the Bonham Female Seminary. He was buried at Bellefontaine Cemetery in St. Louis.

Compositions
Note:this list is incomplete.
Imogen, Opera, 1832
Velleda, Opera, 1835 (see Veleda)
Salvator Rosa, Opera, 1848
Der Seher von Khorassan, Opera, 1850
Comala, Opera, 1857
Mohega, Opera, 1859
Lazarus, Oratorio
Johannes der Täufer, Oratorio
Himmel und Erde, Oratorio
Der Retter, Oratorio
Süd und Nord, Symphony

Writings

Reactionary Letters, 1854
Opera, Not Drama, 1857
Debates About Music, 1857
Chronicle of the newest School of Music, 1859

References

External links 
 
 Washington University Special Collections - Eduard Sobolewski

1804 births
1872 deaths
19th-century classical composers
German Romantic composers
American Romantic composers
German opera composers
Male opera composers
American opera composers
German male classical composers
American male classical composers
German emigrants to the United States
Musicians from Königsberg
19th-century American composers
19th-century German composers
19th-century German male musicians